David Wise is a British video game music composer and musician. He was a composer at Rare from 1985 to 2009, and was the company's sole musician up until 1994. He has gained a following for his work on various games, particularly Nintendo's Donkey Kong Country series. Wise is known for his atmospheric style of music, mixing natural environmental sounds with prominent melodic and percussive accompaniment.

Career and influences
Wise has said that he has had a wide range of musical influences. The first instrument he learned to play was the piano, before later learning the trumpet, and learning to play the drums during adolescence. He played in a few bands during his youth, and was active in a band as of 2004. His career at Rare began when he happened to meet its two founders, as he explained in response to a question posted on its company website: "I was working in a music shop demonstrating a Yamaha CX5 Music Computer to a couple of people, Tim & Chris Stamper. I'd written and programmed the music for the demonstration material. They offered me a job."

While working at Rare, Wise gained attention and acclaim for his work on the Donkey Kong Country series. In addition to the percussive and ambient 'jungle' influences that serve as a thematic undercurrent for much of the series, the games feature a wide variety of different musical styles that are reflective of the various areas and environments they appear in. In the January 1996 issue of Electronic Gaming Monthly, Wise stated that his travelling experiences largely shaped the sound and mood of each Donkey Kong soundtrack, further saying that the music for Donkey Kong Country 2: Diddy's Kong Quest was composed during what he called his "experimental Paris phase". He has composed the soundtrack for the Game Boy Advance port of Donkey Kong Country 3: Dixie Kong's Double Trouble!.

In October 2009, it was announced by the OverClocked ReMix community that Wise was remixing a track for Serious Monkey Business, an unofficial Donkey Kong Country 2 remix album. Grant Kirkhope and Robin Beanland collaborated on this track, playing guitar and trumpet respectively. On 15 March 2010, Serious Monkey Business was released and Wise's track, "Re-Skewed", was featured as track No. 33. Much like his contribution to Serious Monkey Business, Wise later remixed his own composition, the GBA version of "Jungle Jitter", for an unofficial Donkey Kong Country 3 remix album titled Double the Trouble!, which was released on 1 December 2012. Wise also provided a saxophone solo for another remix, in addition to mixing and mastering the track.

On 14 November 2009, Wise announced his resignation from Rare, feeling that the company had "changed a great deal" and there was no longer an opportunity to create music tracks that Rare is most known for. In December 2010 Wise created a personal studio called the 'David Wise Sound Studio'. In June 2013, it was announced that he would be composing for Donkey Kong Country: Tropical Freeze, after receiving a call from Retro Studios president Michael Kelbaugh, who previously worked at Rare. Wise composed for Yooka-Laylee along with Kirkhope and Steve Burke.

Works

References

External links
 
 
 Profile at MobyGames
 

Year of birth unknown
British composers
British male composers
Freelance musicians
Living people
Rare (company) people
Video game composers
Year of birth missing (living people)